This article lists the presidents of Bangladesh, and includes persons sworn into the office as President of Bangladesh following the Proclamation of Bangladeshi Independence in 1971.

Numbering 
After Sheikh Mujibur Rahman, the first President of Bangladesh, there is no single numbering system for the subsequent presidents that is universally accepted and followed, even by government representatives. Different sources may calculate the numbering in different ways, depending whether they count acting presidents, how multiple terms are treated, whether the count is by number of terms or number of individuals, and other factors. For example, A. Q. M. Badruddoza Chowdhury, although he served only a single term, has been described in a government publication and in the press as the 16th President of Bangladesh, as well as the 15th, the 13th and the 11th.

A list published in 2018 by Bdnews24.com appears to coincide with statements made by the country's Election Committee, making Mohammad Abdul Hamid the 20th President when first elected in 2013, yet contradicts the numbering of a list published in 2016 on the President's own official website. The Bangladesh High Commission, Singapore, in 2018 lists him as the 22nd President. Other reports about previous presidents, including some by Bangladesh's newspaper of record the Daily Star, do not correspond with either list.

List of officeholders 
Political parties

Other factions

Status

See also 
 Presidential elections in Bangladesh
 Caretaker government of Bangladesh
 Chief Advisor
 Prime Minister of Bangladesh
 List of prime ministers of Bangladesh
 Politics of Bangladesh
 President of Bangladesh
 Vice President of Bangladesh
 List of rulers of Bengal

Notes

References

External links 
 World Statesmen – Bangladesh

Bangladesh

Presidents